Tipi da spiaggia is a 1959 Italian comedy film directed by Mario Mattoli and starring Johnny Dorelli.

Cast
Ugo Tognazzi: Pasubio Giovinezza
Christiane Martel: Barbara Patton
Giustino Durano: Nick Balmora
Johnny Dorelli: Giorgio Binotti
Lauretta Masiero: Silvia Barentson 
Gino Buzzanca: Giovanni
Edy Vessel: Lucy
Liana Orfei: Magalì 
Annie Gorassini: Hildegarde  
Cesare Polacco: Prince Joakim 
Luciano Salce: Dr. Ionescu

External links

1959 films
1950s Italian-language films
1959 comedy films
Films directed by Mario Mattoli
Italian comedy films
1950s Italian films